Dimitar Gyuzelov was a Macedonian Bulgarian revolutionary and philosopher. He is the father of Macedonian writer Bogomil Gyuzel and artist Liljana Gyuzelova, who between 1996 and 2006 worked on an art installation titled The Perpetual Return, dedicated to her father, his murder, and the stigma that the children of prominent Bulgarians who had been persecuted by the Yugoslav authorities after 1945 had to endure.

Biography
Gyuzelov was born in 1902 in Doyran, then in the Ottoman Empire, but after the destruction of the city during World War I his family moved to Strumica. He finished Serbian high school in that city and then studied philosophy and Slavic studies in the Faculty of Philosophy in Skopje, during which time he was sponsored by Internal Macedonian Revolutionary Organization (IMRO).

After the occupation of most of the Yugoslav Vardar Banovina by Bulgaria in 1941, Gyuzelov became director of Radio Skopje. After the end of war, the Communist government of Yugoslavia sentenced him to death by hanging, labeling him like many other prominent Bulgarians as a "Bulgarian fascist". He was shot, together with Dimitar Chkatrov, in the vicinity of Zaychev Rid, three kilometers outside of Skopje.

References

Attribution
This article contains portions translated from the corresponding article of the Bulgarian Wikipedia. A list of contributors can be found there on the History section.

1902 births
1945 deaths
Bulgarian revolutionaries
People from Dojran
Macedonian Bulgarians
People executed by Yugoslavia by firing squad
Bulgarian people executed abroad
20th-century Bulgarian philosophers
Executed Yugoslav collaborators with Nazi Germany